The 1997–98 UIC Flames men's basketball team represented the University of Illinois at Chicago during the 1997–98 NCAA Division I men's basketball season. The Flames, led by head coach Jimmy Collins, played their home games at the UIC Pavilion in Chicago, Illinois as members of the Midwestern Collegiate Conference. UIC finished as regular season co-champions by going 12–2 in MCC play. They were knocked out early in the MCC tournament, but received an at-large bid to the NCAA tournament  the first bid in program history. Playing as No. 9 seed in the East region, UIC was beaten by No. 8 seed UNC Charlotte, 77–62, in the opening round.

Roster

Schedule and results

|-
!colspan=9 style=| Regular season

|-
!colspan=9 style=| MCC tournament

|-
!colspan=9 style=| NCAA tournament

|-

Source

References

UIC Flames men's basketball seasons
Uic
Uic
Uic
Uic